The 1922 Yukon general election was set to be held on September 11, 1922. The results of the election were known on August 12, 1922 when all three electoral districts returned members to the Yukon Territorial Council by acclamation. The council played an advisory role to the federally appointed Commissioner.

Elections results
No vote was held, the only three candidates that turned in nomination papers and deposits were returned by acclamation.

Members elected

References

1922
1922 elections in Canada
Election
September 1922 events